In meteorology, wind speed, or wind flow speed, is a fundamental atmospheric quantity caused by air moving from high to low pressure, usually due to changes in temperature. Wind speed is now commonly measured with an anemometer.

Wind speed affects weather forecasting, aviation and maritime operations, construction projects, growth and metabolism rate of many plant species, and has countless other implications. Note that wind direction is usually almost parallel to isobars (and not perpendicular, as one might expect), due to Earth's rotation.

Units 
Metres per second (m/s) is the SI unit for velocity and the unit recommended by the World Meteorological Organization for reporting wind speeds, and is amongst others used in weather forecasts in the Nordic countries. Since 2010 the International Civil Aviation Organization (ICAO) also recommends meters per second for reporting wind speed when approaching runways, replacing their former recommendation of using kilometres per hour (km/h).

For historical reasons, other units such as miles per hour (mph), knots (kn) or feet per second (ft/s) are also sometimes used to measure wind speeds. Historically, wind speeds have also been classified using the Beaufort scale, which is based on visual observations of specifically defined wind effects at sea or on land.

Factors affecting wind speed
Wind speed is affected by a number of factors and situations, operating on varying scales (from micro to macro scales). These include the pressure gradient, Rossby waves and jet streams, and local weather conditions. There are also links to be found between wind speed and wind direction, notably with the pressure gradient and terrain conditions.

Pressure gradient is a term to describe the difference in air pressure between two points in the atmosphere or on the surface of the Earth. It is vital to wind speed, because the greater the difference in pressure, the faster the wind flows (from the high to low pressure) to balance out the variation. The pressure gradient, when combined with the Coriolis effect and friction, also influences wind direction.

Rossby waves are strong winds in the upper troposphere. These operate on a global scale and move from West to East (hence being known as Westerlies). The Rossby waves are themselves a different wind speed from what we experience in the lower troposphere.

Local weather conditions play a key role in influencing wind speed, as the formation of hurricanes, monsoons and cyclones as freak weather conditions can drastically affect the flow velocity of the wind.

Highest speed

The fastest wind speed not related to tornadoes ever recorded was during the passage of Tropical Cyclone Olivia on 10 April 1996: an automatic weather station on Barrow Island, Australia, registered a maximum wind gust of  The wind gust was evaluated by the WMO Evaluation Panel who found that the anemometer was mechanically sound and the gust was within statistical probability and ratified the measurement in 2010. The anemometer was mounted 10 m above ground level (and thus 64 m above sea level). The pattern and scales of the gusts suggest that a mesovortex was embedded in the already strong eyewall of the cyclone.

The anemometer, specifically designed for use on Mount Washington was later tested by the US National Weather Bureau and confirmed to be accurate.

Wind speeds within certain atmospheric phenomena (such as tornadoes) may greatly exceed these values but have never been accurately measured. Directly measuring these tornadic winds is rarely done as the violent wind would destroy the instruments. A method of estimating speed is to use Doppler on Wheels to sense the wind speeds remotely, and, using this method, the figure of  during the 1999 Bridge Creek–Moore tornado in Oklahoma on 3 May 1999 is often quoted as the highest-recorded surface wind speed, although another figure of  has also been quoted for the same tornado. However, speeds measured by Doppler radar are not considered official records.

In a press release, the University announced that the methods used from measuring HD 189733b's wind speeds could be used to measure wind speeds on Earth-like exoplanets.

Measurement 

An anemometer is one of the tools used to measure wind speed. A device consisting of a vertical pillar and three or four concave cups, the anemometer captures the horizontal movement of air particles (wind speed).

Unlike traditional cup and vane anemometers, ultrasonic wind sensors have no moving parts and are therefore used to measure wind speed in applications that require maintenance-free performance, such as on the top of wind turbines. As the name suggests, ultrasonic wind sensors measure the wind speed using high-frequency sound. An ultrasonic anemometer has two or three pairs of sound transmitters and receivers. Stand it in the wind and each transmitter constantly beams high-frequency sound to its respective receiver. Electronic circuits inside measure the time it takes for the sound to make its journey from each transmitter to the corresponding receiver. Depending on how the wind blows, it will affect some of the sound beams more than the others, slowing it down or speeding it up very slightly. The circuits measure the difference in speeds of the beams and use that to calculate how fast the wind is blowing.

Acoustic resonance wind sensors are a variant of the ultrasonic sensor. Instead of using time of flight measurement, acoustic resonance sensors use resonating acoustic waves within a small purpose-built cavity in order to perform their wind speed measurement. Built into the cavity is an array of ultrasonic transducers, which are used to create the separate standing-wave patterns at ultrasonic frequencies. As wind passes through the cavity, a change in the wave's property occurs (phase shift). By measuring the amount of phase shift in the received signals by each transducer, and then by mathematically processing the data, the sensor is able to provide an accurate horizontal measurement of wind speed and direction.

Another tool used to measure wind velocity includes a GPS combined with pitot tube. A fluid flow velocity tool, the Pitot tube is primarily used to determine the air velocity of an aircraft.

Design of structures

Wind speed is a common factor in the design of structures and buildings around the world. It is often the governing factor in the required lateral strength of a structure's design.

In the United States, the wind speed used in design is often referred to as a "3-second gust" which is the highest sustained gust over a 3-second period having a probability of being exceeded per year of 1 in 50 (ASCE 7-05, updated to ASCE 7-16). This design wind speed is accepted by most building codes in the United States and often governs the lateral design of buildings and structures.

In Canada, reference wind pressures are used in design and are based on the "mean hourly" wind speed having a probability of being exceeded per year of 1 in 50.

Historically, wind speeds have been reported with a variety of averaging times (such as fastest mile, 3-second gust, 1-minute and mean hourly) which designers may have to take into account. To convert wind speeds from one averaging time to another, the Durst Curve was developed which defines the relation between probable maximum wind speed averaged over t seconds, Vt, and mean wind speed over one hour V3600.

See also
 American Society of Civil Engineers (promulgator of ASCE 7-05, current version is ASCE 7-16)
 Beaufort scale
 Fujita scale and Enhanced Fujita Scale
 International Building Code (promulgator of NBC 2005)
 ICAO recommendations – International System of Units
 Knot (unit)
 Prevailing wind
 Saffir–Simpson Hurricane Scale
 TORRO scale
 Wind direction

References

External links 
 

Wind
Airspeed
Wind power
Weather extremes of Earth

es:Viento#Características físicas de los vientos